Flip or Flop Fort Worth is a television series airing on HGTV hosted by real estate agents Andy and Ashley Williams. It is a spin-off of the HGTV series Flip or Flop. It premiered on November 2, 2017 and takes place in the Dallas-Fort Worth Metroplex, primarily in Fort Worth.

Premise
On March 1, 2017, HGTV announced that Flip or Flop" would expand to Texas. The show features couple Andy and Ashley Williams as they flip houses in Fort Worth. Andy and Ashley Williams follow the same roles as Tarek and Christina, the couple from the original Flip or Flop, on this show.

Andy and Ashley Williams previously hosted a show on HGTV named Flipping Texas, a pilot show.

Hosts
Andy and Ashley Williams are military veterans who became real estate investors. They buy, rehab and sell houses all over Texas.

Episodes

References

External links
 Official website
 Episode Guide

Flip or Flop (franchise)
2017 American television series debuts
2018 American television series endings
2010s American reality television series
Television shows set in Fort Worth, Texas
Reality television spin-offs
American television spin-offs